Jean-Philippe Baratier (also Johann Philipp Baratier; 19 January 1721 in Schwabach near Nuremberg – 5 October 1740) was a German scholar. A noted child prodigy of the 18th century, he published eleven works and authored a great quantity of unpublished manuscripts.

Life 
Baratier's early education was most carefully conducted by his father, François Baratier, a Huguenot minister at the French Church of Schwabach.

His progress was so rapid that by the time he was five years of age he could speak French, Latin and Dutch with ease, and read Greek fluently. He then studied Hebrew, and in three years was able to translate the Hebrew Bible into Latin or French. He collected materials for a dictionary of rare and difficult Hebrew words, with critical and philological observations; and when he was about eleven years old translated from the Hebrew Tudela’s Itinerarium.

At 14, he was admitted master of arts at Halle, and received into the Royal Academy at Berlin, while working on a method to calculate longitude at sea. The last years of his short life he devoted to the study of history of the Jewish people and antiquities, did translations, and had collected materials for histories of the Thirty Years' War and of Antitrinitarianism, and for an inquiry concerning Egyptian antiquities. His health, which had always been weak, gave way completely under these labours, and he died at the age of nineteen.

In 1741, Johann Heinrich Samuel Formey wrote a biography of him, published at Utrecht (NL)..

References 

Attribution

External links 
 Dictionnaire Bouillet
 The Exchanges of Formey (In French)

1721 births
1740 deaths
German antiquarians
People from the Principality of Ansbach
Christian Hebraists
Members of the Prussian Academy of Sciences
Members of the French Academy of Sciences
German male non-fiction writers